Luke Adam  Dean (born 14 May 1991) is an English professional footballer who plays as a midfielder for Guiseley.

Career
Dean joined Bradford City's centre of excellence in 2002. He made his club debut against Morecambe on 13 April 2010.  becoming the first Asian home grown player to make his debut as a professional for Bradford City. He rewarded with a contract on 16 June 2010 but suffered a setback when he broke his leg in a pre-season friendly.

Dean moved to Ossett Town on loan in March 2011 but was recalled a month later by new Bradford City manager Peter Jackson. Luke Dean was the only player of the 2011 Bradford City out of contract players to be handed a new contract, which would keep him at the club until at least June 2012.

In August 2011, he joined Hinckley United on a month-long loan deal, alongside Darren Stephenson. In May 2012, Dean was released from Bradford . He signed for Harrogate Town of the Conference North in the summer of 2012.

In January 2015, Dean signed a one-month loan deal for Bradford Park Avenue In February 2015, Bradford Park Avenue and Harrogate Town agreed to extend the loan deal until the end of the 2014–15 season.

Dean joined Scarborough on 25 May 2017. He played for the club until May 2019, where he signed with Matlock Town.

In June 2022, Dean joined Guiseley following their relegation from the National League North.

References

External links

Bradford City A.F.C. official profile

1991 births
Living people
People from Cleckheaton
English footballers
Association football midfielders
Bradford City A.F.C. players
FC Halifax Town players
Ossett Town F.C. players
Hinckley United F.C. players
Harrogate Town A.F.C. players
Bradford (Park Avenue) A.F.C. players
Workington A.F.C. players
Scarborough F.C. players
Matlock Town F.C. players
Yorkshire Amateur A.F.C. players
Guiseley A.F.C. players
English Football League players
National League (English football) players
Northern Premier League players
Northern Counties East Football League players